This is a list of skiing deaths of notable people, in chronological order, and includes skiers and snowboarders both professional and recreational whose deaths are due to accidents or avalanches.

List

Notes

References

Lists of people by cause of death
 
Skiing-related lists
Lists of skiers
Deaths in sport